Votran, officially the Volusia County Public Transit System is the public transportation system in Volusia County, Florida, United States. The system was established in 1975. Votran provides fixed bus and paratransit service throughout the entire county

Single rides are $1.75 per trip, or $3.75 for a 24-hour pass.

History
Although the County is employing the Votran personnel directly, the management of the Votran system is contracted to First Transit. First Transit replaced RATP Dev, who had been in contract since the establishment of Votran in 1975, in 2020.

Operations Facilities
Votran houses its main operations center and bus garage/yard in Daytona Beach (950 Big Tree Rd., Daytona Beach, FL 32119), which handles all administrative and a vast majority of other agency functions. Because of the distance between Daytona Beach and DeLand, a second facility is located in Orange City (near US Hwy 17/92) by which encompasses a bus garage/yard area and some operations and light-duty maintenance functions.

Stations
Votran has three main stations:
 Transfer Plaza, corner of N. Palmetto Avenue and M M Bethune Blvd., Daytona Beach. Buses meet and depart every half-hour; Monday–Saturday, 7 am – 7 pm.
 Intermodal Transfer Facility (ITF), 301 Earl Street and North Atlantic Ave. (FL Highway A1A), Daytona Beach. Buses meet and depart on every hour for evening and Sunday service; Monday–Saturday, 7–11 pm; Sunday 7 am – 6 pm. 
Intermodal Transfer Facility (ITF), South Woodland Blvd (US 17/92) and Euclid Ave., DeLand. Buses service the ITF between 4:34 am and 8:36pm 
Other transfer locations are available at most shopping centers and where multiple buses cross paths.

Routes
The Volusia County Government governs the county as three regions, and Votran does the same with its service. Bus routes are grouped into three regions: 
 East (two hubs in Daytona Beach). The East side routes generally service the Daytona Beach, Port Orange, and Ormond Beach areas, With a connector (Route 60) to the DeLand area to connect with Routes 20, 24, and 31 on the Westside.  
 Southeast (hub in New Smyrna Beach). There are Three Southeast Routes and Two Flex Service routes serving the New Smyrna Beachside and Mainland areas. Route 40 goes northbound to Port Orange via US1 and Nova Road to connect with the Eastside Routes near Dunlawton Square. Route 41 travels southbound serving Edgewater and Oak Hill. Route 44 serves State Road 44 in New Smyrna Beach.
 West (hub in Orange City). These routes include the 20, 21, 22, 23, 24, 31, 32, and 33, and service the DeBary, Deltona, DeLand and Orange City areas, with five out of the eight routes focused mainly on Deltona, though two of the three routes (route 21 & route 22) follow similar paths for most of their assigned trips (e.g. the 21 will stop at certain bus stops, with the 22 stopping at the same bus stop the following hour in the opposite direction).  Route 24 connects DeLand to Pierson and Seville in northwestern Volusia County. Routes 31–33 were added for service to the DeBary SunRail Station starting May 1, 2014. Route 31 serves North DeLand to the DeBary SunRail Station (half-hourly, stops at all stops along the way), Route 32 starts in Deltona to the DeBary SunRail Station via Orange City (hourly, stops at all stops along the way), Route 33 began as a Limited Stop, or Express bus from Deltona to the DeBary SunRail station via Orange City (hourly, limited stops). In 2019, the route was modified to allow for more stops, but the "Express" designation remains unchanged on the website.

For the 20-series routes, service hours on the West Side are from roughly 5:30 a.m. – 7:30 p.m. Service runs hourly on the 20 & 23, bihourly on the 21/22, and thrice daily on the 24. The 30-series routes run during rush hour only, but start earlier and end later, because they are oriented towards people taking SunRail to work in Orlando.

The East Side division is the only one that provides Sunday and night service for its routes.

Votran created the Route 25 on February 25, 2019, but was discontinued due to low ridership in August 2020. Due to the COVID-19 pandemic, many routes have had to operate with reduced schedules.

Route Table 
VTP stands for VORTRAN Transfer Plaza, and ITF stands for Intermodal Transit Facility.

Fleet

Votran utilizes a fleet consisting mostly of 35' Gillig Low Floor transit buses, with two 29' models. Most of the agency's buses are diesel powered, with some being diesel-electric hybrids. The oldest buses were manufactured in 2006 and are slated for retirement during the course of the next couple of years.

The fleet for the New Smyrna Beach Flex and paratransit (Gold) services consists of various model cutaway vans. 

Active

Retired

References

External links

Bus transportation in Florida
Transportation in Volusia County, Florida
1975 establishments in Florida